National Route 13 is a highway in southern Vietnam stretching from the northeastern outskirts of Ho Chi Minh City, the commercial centre of the country, towards the border to Cambodia. The highway starts around Thủ Đức on the northern outskirts of Ho Chi Minh City, once the site of the military academy of the Army of the Republic of Vietnam, and travels north through the provinces of Bình Dương and Bình Phước. The highway passes through the districts of Thuận An, Thủ Dầu Một town, Bến Cát, Chơn Thành, Đồng Phú, Bình Long, and Lộc Ninh.

During the Vietnam War the road was nicknamed Thunder Road by US forces.

References

13